Casper Philip Pedersen (born 15 March 1996) is a road and track cyclist from Denmark, who currently rides for UCI WorldTeam .

In 2015 he competed at the 2015 UCI Track Cycling World Championships in the men's omnium. He won the bronze medal in the team pursuit at the 2015 UEC European Track Championships in Grenchen, Switzerland. In September 2018  announced that Pedersen would join them on a three-year deal from 2019, initially with a role as a domestique in the Flanders classics and the team's sprint train. In August 2019, he was named in the startlist for the 2019 Vuelta a España. In August 2020, he was named in the startlist for the 2020 Tour de France.

Major results

Road

2014
 2nd Paris–Roubaix Juniors
2015
 3rd Scandinavian Race Uppsala
2016
 2nd Road race, National Under-23 Championships
 7th Eschborn-Frankfurt City Loop U23
2017
 1st  Road race, UEC European Under-23 Championships
 1st GP Horsens
 1st Stage 2 Flèche du Sud
 2nd Fyen Rundt
 2nd Eschborn-Frankfurt City Loop U23
 3rd Road race, National Under-23 Championships
 3rd Overall Danmark Rundt
1st Stage 1
 10th Overall Kreiz Breizh Elites
2018
 5th Overall Four Days of Dunkirk
1st  Young rider classification
2020
 1st Paris–Tours
2021
 6th Overall Okolo Slovenska
2023
 1st Figueira Champions Classic
 4th Trofeo Calvia

Grand Tour general classification results timeline

Track

2013
 3rd  Omnium, UCI World Junior Championships
2014
 1st  Omnium, UCI World Junior Championships
 3rd Team pursuit, UCI World Cup, London
2015
 3rd  Team pursuit, UEC European Championships
2016
 2nd Team pursuit, UCI World Cup, Hong Kong
2017
 UCI World Cup
1st Team pursuit, Cali
2nd Madison (with Julius Johansen), Los Angeles
2nd Team pursuit, Manchester
 2nd  Madison (with Niklas Larsen), UEC European Championships

References

External links

1996 births
Danish male cyclists
Living people
Place of birth missing (living people)
Danish track cyclists
Olympic cyclists of Denmark
Cyclists at the 2016 Summer Olympics
Cyclists from Copenhagen